John Peter Leedom (December 20, 1847 – March 18, 1895) was a U.S. Representative from Ohio for one-term from 1881 to 1883.

Biography 
Born in Adams County, Ohio, Leedom attended the common schools.  He graduated from Smith's Mercantile College, Portsmouth, Ohio, in 1863.  He went on to teach in the public schools of Portsmouth, and engaged in agricultural pursuits.  Leedom was elected clerk of the court of common pleas of Adams County in 1874 and was reelected in 1877.  He served as a member of the Democratic State central committee in 1879.

Congress 
Leedom was elected as a Democrat to the Forty-seventh Congress (March 4, 1881 – March 3, 1883).  He was an unsuccessful candidate for reelection in 1882 to the Forty-eighth Congress.  He later served as Sergeant at Arms of the House of Representatives from 1884 to 1890.  He died in Toledo, Ohio, and is interred in the Odd Fellows Cemetery, Manchester, Ohio.

See also
List of United States representatives from Ohio

Sources

1847 births
1895 deaths
Sergeants at Arms of the United States House of Representatives
People from Adams County, Ohio
Democratic Party members of the United States House of Representatives from Ohio
19th-century American politicians